Saint Solomonia Yuryevna Saburova (c. 1490 – 18 December 1542) was the first wife of Grand Prince Vasili III of Muscovy. She was canonized by the Russian Orthodox Church as Saint Sofia of Suzdal.

Life
Her father was Yury Konstantinovich Saburov, a nobleman who was elevated to boyar upon his daughter's marriage to the monarch. One of her relatives later became the wife of Ivan IV's son and heir, Ivan Ivanovich, and another lady of the Saburov-Godunov clan was Irina Feodorovna, the wife of the last Rurikid tsar, Feodor I.  One other relative Boris Godunov reigned as Tsar Boris I of Russia.

Grand Princess
The wedding of Solomonia and Vasily III took place on 4 September 1505, in presence of the groom's father, Ivan III. Metropolitan Simon blessed the newlyweds at the Cathedral of the Dormition in the Moscow Kremlin. After twenty years, it became apparent that Solomonia was barren. Vasili perfectly understood that if he died childless his brothers would inherit the throne. In order to preclude this scenario, they were incarcerated or forbidden to marry until his own son was born. In the long term, this led to the extinction of the Rurikid dynasty and to the succession crisis known as the Time of Troubles.

Despite her shining beauty, exemplary morals and mild character, Solomonia's failure to beget an heir must have weighed upon Vasili's relations with his wife, who turned to foreign doctors for help. In 1525, the grand prince decided to divorce Solomonia with the approval of Metropolitan Daniel and the boyars, although Vassian Patrikeyev, Maksim Grek, and some other ecclesiastical authorities declared the divorce unlawful.

Later life
In November 1525, the marriage was annulled and Solomonia was forced to take the veil under the name of Sophia at the Nativity Monastery of Moscow. She was then moved to the Intercession Monastery in Suzdal, one of the many votive churches commissioned by Vasily and his wife in supplication for the birth of an heir.

Sigismund von Herberstein asserts in his Notes on Muscovite Affairs that she was forcefully taken to the convent, whereas the Russian chronicles tend to underline Solomonia's submission to the sovereign's will. There were rumors that Solomonia had given birth to a child named George within the walls of the monastery. She died in Suzdal in 1542.

In Culture 

Solomonia Saburova's realtionship with husband Vasili III of Moscow was fictionalised in the opera Neprigozhaya by Ella Adayevskaya

References

|-

|-

|-

1490 births
1542 deaths
Russian royal consorts
Russian saints of the Eastern Orthodox Church
16th-century Christian saints
Christian female saints of the Early Modern era
Rurik dynasty
Female saints of medieval Russia
Eastern Orthodox royal saints
15th-century Russian people
15th-century Russian women
16th-century Russian people
16th-century Russian women